Paul Hogarth, OBE, RA (born Arthur Paul Hoggarth) (4 October 1917 – 27 December 2001) was an English artist and illustrator. He is best known for the cover drawings that he prepared in the 1980s for the Penguin edition of Graham Greene's books. He had distant connection with William Hogarth, whose father was also born Hoggarth.

Biography
Paul Hogarth was born in Kendal, Westmorland, and aged 6 moved in 1923 with his family to Manchester. He attended the Manchester School of Art from 1934 to 1936, where he became involved in the Artists' International Association and the Communist Party of Great Britain. After 1936 he attended Saint Martin's School of Art in London, and drove lorries in the Spanish Civil War for the International Brigade.

Paul Hogarth was a painter with a talent for illustration and reportage, which was allied to his love of travel. This led him to produce drawings and watercolours recording events and places all over the world.  As an illustrator he studied under James Boswell, and worked with a number of eminent authors, including Robert Graves, Graham Greene, Brendan Behan, Lawrence Durrell, and William Golding. He illustrated the New Penguin Shakespeare series of paperbacks in the 1970s, and his work can also be seen on the cover of John Wyndham's The Midwich Cuckoos (1964, Penguin  ).

He was elected an associate member of the Royal Academy in 1974, a full member in 1984; and was awarded the OBE in 1989. His work is held in collections worldwide, and he exhibited regularly in the Francis Kyle Gallery in London.

Hogarth died on 27 December 2001(age 84). At the time of his death he had been married to actress Diana Hogarth (stage name Diana Robson) for 12 years.

References

Further reading

 Paul Hogarth, Drawing on Life: The Autobiography of Paul Hogarth (2002. Royal Academy of Arts).
 Paul Hogarth, The Artist as Reporter (1986)
 Paul Hogarth, Creative Ink Drawing (1968)
 Paul Hogarth, Creative Pencil Drawing (1964)
 Richard Knott,The Secret War Against the Arts (2020)

External links
Obituary (Hogarth Family HQ)
Hogarth archive (Archives Hub)
Books by Hogarth ("Books and Writers")

Alumni of Saint Martin's School of Art
20th-century English painters
English male painters
English illustrators
English watercolourists
International Brigades personnel
Officers of the Order of the British Empire
Royal Academicians
British illustrators
1917 births
2001 deaths
British people of the Spanish Civil War
20th-century English male artists